Thaayi Saheba is an Indian Kannada language film released in 1997 directed by Girish Kasaravalli. The film was an adaptation of Kannada novel of same name written by Ranganath Shyamrao Lokapura.

Plot summary
The film is based on the story of a Brahmin family during the pre independence and post independence periods of India. The protagonist Narmada Thayi is the second wife of Appa Sahib, a freedom fighter. The childless couple decide to adopt the child of Venkobanna, a close relative. Venkobanna has other plans in mind when he gives away his child in adoption. He calculates that his son will inherit the family's money and property. In the meanwhile, Appa Sahib also has an illicit relationship with Chandri and a daughter is born to them. Narmada Thayi is a patient woman and although aware of her husband's character, she supports him and the household. After the independence, Appa Sahib supports the government's view that the laborers who till the land own them. Venkobanna is angered to see this long-awaited plan of his crumble due to the utopian views of App Sahib. After a brief illness, Appa Sahib leaves the house one day with a group of people to protest for the sake of the farmers never to return again. Months after this, Narmada learns that her husband has been imprisoned by the government. But no other detail regarding Appa Sahib comes to light. Narmada Thayi is the only one capable of handling the household. She seeks the help of Venkobanna to help her handle monetary issues. Meanwhile, their adopted son comes of age. The story takes a surprise and unexpected turn when Thayi Saheba discovers that her adopted son is in love with Appa Sahib's mistress's daughter, who legally is his sister. She tries in vain to convince her son not to go against social ethics. With Chandri, Narmada Thayi sets out to find her husband. Together they travel to many prisons, but Appa Sahib is never found. Thayi Saheba must either save the son, who seeks freedom to marry Chandri's daughter or save herself because if she supports the marriage, she could be jailed. She tries to cancel the adoption, but no such thing as adoption cancellation existed then. She also tries to see if somebody can adopt Chandri's daughter, but adopting a girl child was never allowed. Finally, Thayi Saheba tells her son that he is free to do whatever he wants. She gets ready to face the serious consequence of the marriage. The film ends with Thayi Saheba waiting on the steps of her house and an angered Venkobanna arriving with the police and announcing their arrival.

Cast
 Jaimala
 Suresh Heblikar
 Shivaram
 Harish Raju
 Bharath
 Ranukamma Murugodu
 Basavaraj Murugodu
 Sudha Belawadi
 Vijaya Ekkundi
 Rathi Manjunath
 Deepa Rabakavi
 Sunanda Kadapatti
 Vishweshwara Surapura
 Venkata Rao
 H. G. Somasekhara Rao

Interpretations
It is difficult to say what Thaayi Saheba was all about. It was evidently a film that narrated the transition in the Indian society from the pre independence to the post independence periods. We can easily skip the transition part and look at the film as a straight narrative about the life of Narmada Thayi. The film also narrates the social conditions of women during that period. Thayi Saheba can definitely be viewed as a sum total of all these interpretations. We witness the social and political transition of the Indian Society through the life of the protagonist.

Highlights
Thaayi Saheba was a very well made film. The plot subject was highly complex and handling such an intricate theme and adapting it to the celluloid was a difficult task. Jaimala's performance as Thaayi Saheba was widely appreciated.
The climax was yet another feature of the film that left a lasting impression on the viewer. The picture of Narmada Thayi sitting on the porch of her house prepared to face the police is unforgettable. As Venkobanna announces the arrival of the police, the camera just moves up giving us a final glimpse of the protagonist and then the light fades out.

Awards and screenings
45th National Film Awards
Best Film — Girish Kasaravalli
Special Jury Award — Jaimala
Best Costume Design — Vaishali Kasaravalli
Best Art Direction — Ramesh Desai

Mysore Sandal Gold Awards
Best Film
Best Cinematographer — Ramachandra
Best Actress — Jaimala

46th Filmfare Awards South
The film won three filmfare awards in the Kannada film category.
 Best Film
 Best Director — Girish Kasaravalli
 Best Actress — Jaimala

V Shantaram Awards
 Best Film
 Best Director — Girish Kasaravalli

 1997–98 Karnataka State Film Awards
 First Best Film
 Best Actress — Jaimala
 Best Supporting Actor — Shivaram
 Best Story — Ranganath Shyam Rao Lokapura
 Best Cinematographer — H. M. Ramachandra

Screenings
 Vancouver Film Festival

References

External links
 
 Transcending the mundane Frontline

1990s Kannada-language films
1997 films
Best Feature Film National Film Award winners
Films based on Indian novels
Films directed by Girish Kasaravalli
Films whose production designer won the Best Production Design National Film Award
Films that won the Best Costume Design National Film Award